Jacob "Jake" Reitan (born 1982) is an LGBT activist who founded the Soulforce Equality Ride.

Reitan was born in 1982 in Mankato, Minnesota into a Lutheran family and is one of four siblings. He came out to his parents while a junior in high school. In high school, he helped create the first gay-straight alliance at Mankato West High School. He graduated magna cum laude from Northwestern University in Evanston, Illinois, majoring in Communication Studies and Political Science. He received his masters from Harvard Divinity School and his J.D. degree from the University of Minnesota Law School.

After some experimentation in 2005, he and Haven Herrin launched Soulforce's Equality Ride Project in 2006. He was arrested for trespassing at Liberty University in March where he said: "We want to come to the school today to say, 'learn from history.' We have a right to be here, because this school teaches that being gay is being sick and sinful. We have a right to question and to show how we are children of God." A few weeks later at West Point, just before being arrested, he said that "We're going to take this country by storm and in five years' time, it's going to be a different country because of us." When he, Herrin and a third friend attempted to enlist in the Minnesota National Guard to protest the military's "Don't ask, don't tell" policy, he was not immediately rejected, but told his arrest at West Point would need to be resolved first. Advocate Magazine named him as one of its People of the Year for 2006 and Out Magazine named him one of the Out 100 people of 2006.

Reitan is featured in the documentary film about the 2006 Equality Ride, Equality U.

He wrote a regular column called "Faith in Action" that appeared in Lavender, a Minnesota LGBT news magazine. He and his family appeared in the documentary For the Bible Tells Me So.

On December 22, 2010, at the invitation of the White House, Reitan joined other LGBT rights activists to witness the signing of the Don't Ask, Don't Tell Repeal Act of 2010.

Currently, Jacob works as an attorney at Reitan Law Office with offices in Mankato, Chaska and Minneapolis, Minnesota.  He represents clients in the areas of a personal injury, Social Security disability and worker's compensation.  www.reitanlawoffice.com

References

External links 
 Soulforce
 

1982 births
American LGBT rights activists
LGBT people from Minnesota
Northwestern University alumni
University of Minnesota Law School alumni
Harvard Divinity School alumni
Living people